Andre Cornelius Patterson Sr. (born June 12, 1960) is an American football coach who is the defensive line coach for the New York Giants of the National Football League (NFL).  He has previously been a defensive line coach for the Denver Broncos, Cleveland Browns, Dallas Cowboys, New England Patriots and Minnesota Vikings.  Patterson was the head football coach at California Polytechnic State University from 1994 to 1996.

College career
Patterson started his college football playing career at Contra Costa College from 1978 to 1980 as a defensive lineman.  He then transferred to the University of Montana in 1981 before suffering a career-ending knee injury.  Patterson graduated from Montana in 1983 with a bachelor's degree in secondary education.

Coaching career

High school and college
Patterson started his coaching career as a graduate assistant at Montana.  He then became an assistant coach at Renton High School from 1983 to 1986 and Saint Monica Catholic High School in 1987, where he also coached the varsity baseball team.  He returned to the college football level in 1989 with Western Michigan as a defensive coordinator.  Patterson remained as a college football coach on defense with several different teams until 1997 when he received his first opportunity to coach in the National Football League (NFL).

NFL
In 1997, New England Patriots head coach Pete Carroll brought Patterson in to be the defensive line coach.  Patterson then became a defensive line coach for the Minnesota Vikings, Dallas Cowboys, Cleveland Browns, and Denver Broncos.

Return to high school level
In 2007, Patterson returned to coaching high school football, becoming the offensive line coach at Regis Jesuit High School, where his son was an incoming freshman.

Return to collegiate level
Patterson became an assistant head coach and defensive line coach at the University of Nevada, Las Vegas (UNLV) from 2008 to 2009.  He became the defensive coordinator and defensive line coach at the University of Texas at El Paso (UTEP) from 2010 to 2012.  His most recent college football stint was with Florida International University (FIU) in 2013 as an assistant head coach and defensive line coach.

Return to the NFL

Minnesota Vikings
In 2014, Patterson returned to the Minnesota Vikings as the defensive line coach under first-year head coach Mike Zimmer.  Patterson led a strong defensive line in 2015, when the Vikings won their first NFC North Division title since 2009 and allowed the fifth-fewest points on defense.

Patterson was given the title of assistant head coach, along with co-defensive coordinator and defensive line coach, by the Vikings on April 14, 2021.

New York Giants
On February 10, 2022, Patterson was hired by the New York Giants to be the defensive line coach under head coach Brian Daboll.

Personal life
Patterson and his wife, Donna, have two children: Andre Jr. and Ashmera.

Head coaching record

College

References

External links
 Minnesota Vikings profile

1960 births
Living people
American football defensive linemen
Cal Poly Mustangs football coaches
Cleveland Browns coaches
Contra Costa Comets football players
Cornell Big Red football coaches
Dallas Cowboys coaches
Denver Broncos coaches
FIU Panthers football coaches
Minnesota Vikings coaches
Montana Grizzlies football coaches
Montana Grizzlies football players
National Football League defensive coordinators
New England Patriots coaches
UNLV Rebels football coaches
UTEP Miners football coaches
Weber State Wildcats football coaches
Western Michigan Broncos football coaches
High school football coaches in California
High school football coaches in Colorado
High school football coaches in Washington (state)
People from Camden, Arkansas
Players of American football from Arkansas
African-American coaches of American football
African-American players of American football
21st-century African-American people
20th-century African-American sportspeople
New York Giants coaches